Malwelwe is a village in Kweneng District of Botswana. It is located 70 km northwest of Molepolole. The population was 930 in 2001 census.

References

Kweneng District
Villages in Botswana